Dystonin (DST), also known as bullous pemphigoid antigen 1 (BPAG1), isoforms 1/2/3/4/5/8, is a protein that in humans is encoded by the DST gene.

This gene encodes a member of the plakin protein family of adhesion junction plaque proteins. Multiple alternatively spliced transcript variants encoding distinct isoforms have been found for this gene, but the full-length nature of some variants has not been defined. It has been known that some isoforms are expressed in neural and muscle tissue, anchoring neural intermediate filaments to the actin cytoskeleton, and some isoforms are expressed in epithelial tissue, anchoring keratin-containing intermediate filaments to hemidesmosomes. Consistent with the expression, mice defective for this gene show skin blistering and neurodegeneration.

Interactions 

Dystonin has been shown to interact with collagen, type XVII, alpha 1, DCTN1, MAP1B and erbin.

Loss of function in neurological disease
Several Dst mutant mouse lines have been described which share the common feature of having sensory neuron degeneration. In humans, loss of dystonin function can cause hereditary sensory and autonomic neuropathy type VI and axonal Charcot-Marie-Tooth disease. In both human diseases, pathology is likely attributable to the loss of the dystonin-a2 protein isoform, which plays a role in neuronal autophagy.

See also 
 Bullous pemphigoid

References

Further reading 

 
 
 
 
 
 
 
 
 
 
 
 
 
 
 

EF-hand-containing proteins
Plakins